Bockum is a northeastern district of Krefeld, North Rhine-Westphalia,
Germany. With its large parks, its advantageous location and high housing comfort, it is one of the most favoured residential areas in the city. The center of Bockum is marked by the neogothic church of St. Gertrudis. In addition, the zoo, the Stadtwald, the Grotenburg Stadion and a large swimming facility offer diverse recreational opportunities. The living costs lie in the upper third, with mostly single occupancy housing; the population is considered mostly conservative.

Places to visit
 Haus Sollbrüggen
 Krefeld Zoo

References

External links
 Information on the official homepage of Krefeld
 Aerial photography of Bockum on www.krefeld.de
 Map of the districts of Krefeld

Towns in North Rhine-Westphalia
Krefeld